Geoffrey Paterson (born 14 July 1983) is a British conductor.

Early career
Born in Kent, England, Geoffrey Paterson began conducting at the age of 15, while a pupil at The Judd School in Tonbridge. He soon began organising concerts, both near his family home in Kent and later as an undergraduate at St John's College, Cambridge. He studied for a master's degree at the RSAMD before pursuing a career as repetiteur and assistant conductor with the National Opera Studio.  At the age of 25 he won both First Prize and the Audience Prize at the Ninth Leeds Conductors Competition.

Conducting
He was a Jette Parker Young Artist at the Royal Opera House, where he assisted Antonio Papano, Mark Elder, Andris Nelsons and Daniele Gatti, and has frequently returned to Covent Garden to conduct. In 2013 and 2014 he was a musical assistant to Kirill Petrenko at the Bayreuth Festival, and his operatic conducting has included appearances at Glyndebourne and the Royal Danish Opera.

He has conducted the Orchestra of the Age of Enlightenment, the Philharmonia, London Sinfonietta, Danish National Symphony Orchestra and BBC Scottish Symphony Orchestra.

In addition to his work at Bayreuth, he has appeared at other festivals including the Holland Festival, Aldeburgh Festival and Bregenz Festival.

He is a noted exponent of contemporary music, working frequently with the London Sinfonietta and Birmingham Contemporary Music Group and recording for NMC.

Recordings
Marius Neset: Viaduct with London Sinfonietta for ACT
Marius Neset: Snowmelt with London Sinfonietta for ACT
Massenet: Le Portrait de Manon with Southbank Sinfonia for Opera Rara
Giux: Images of Broken Light with the London Sinfonietta for Neu Records
Ben Foskett: Dinosaur with the Hallé for NMC
Philharmonia Composers Academy Vol. 3 with the Philharmonia for NMC

References

External links
 Official Website

1983 births
British male conductors (music)
Living people
Alumni of the Royal Conservatoire of Scotland
Prize-winners of the Leeds Conductors Competition
People educated at The Judd School
Alumni of St John's College, Cambridge
21st-century British conductors (music)
21st-century British male musicians